Roman Statkowski (24 December 1859 – 12 November 1925) was a Polish composer, most notable for his operas and chamber music.

Early life

Statkowski was born in Szczypiorno, near Kalisz, and initially trained as a lawyer.  When he deserted the law for a musical career, he studied with Władysław Żeleński in Warsaw and then at the Saint Petersburg Conservatory with Nikolai Soloviev and Anton Rubinstein, graduating at the age of 31 in 1890.

Musical influences

His musical influences were mainly Russian, specifically Mussorgsky and Tchaikovsky, but he was also attracted to German music such as the tone poems of Richard Strauss and the operas of Hans Pfitzner. His work has been described as linking the post-Moniuszko composers and the generation of Szymanowski.

Operas

Statkowski's two operas were Philaenis (or Filenis) (1897, first performed in 1904) and Maria (1903-4, first performed in 1906).  The latter is based on a novel of the same name by Antoni Malczewski. It has achieved some popularity in its native country and has been performed in various Polish cities between 1919 and 1965.  It was staged by Wexford Festival Opera in late 2011.

Other compositions

These include a set of piano Preludes (op. 37) and a Krakowiak for violin and piano, as well as six string quartets and a number of songs.

Later life

In 1909, Statkowski was appointed to succeed Zygmunt Noskowski as professor of composition at the Warsaw Conservatory. His pupils there included Jan Maklakiewicz, Piotr Perkowski, Apolinary Szeluto, Boleslaw Szabelski and Victor Young.  He died in Warsaw in 1925.

References

Discography 
2005 : Piano Works vol. 1 - Acte Préalable AP0126 
2008 : Piano Works vol. 2 - Acte Préalable AP0176

External links

 Scores by Roman Statkowski in digital library Polona

1859 births
1925 deaths
Musicians from Kalisz
People from Warsaw Governorate
Polish composers
Polish music educators
Polish opera composers
Polish male classical composers
Saint Petersburg Conservatory alumni